Prashant V. Kamat is a Professor of Chemistry and Biochemistry and a Principal Scientist of Radiation Laboratory, University of Notre Dame. He is affiliated with the Department of Chemical and Biomolecular Engineering as a Concurrent Professor. He earned his masters (1974) and doctoral degree (1979) in Physical Chemistry from Bombay University, and carried out his postdoctoral research at Boston University (1979–1981) and University of Texas at Austin (1981–1983).

Research career
Prashant Kamat has made significant research contributions to physical chemistry and material science, seeking to utilize nanomaterials and nanomaterial heterostructures for light energy conversion. Recently his research efforts have focused heavily on Quantum dot solar cell development. He has published more than 450 peer-reviewed journal papers, review articles and book chapters. He has edited two books in the area of nanoscale materials. These publications have been widely cited in the scientific community, giving Dr. Kamat nearly 100000 citations and an h-index of 160. He is the first editor in chief of  ACS Energy Letters. He was a fellow of Japan Society for Promotion of Science during 1997 and 2003 and was presented 2006 Honda-Fujishima Lectureship award by the Japan Photochemical Society.  In 2008 he became a Fellow of the Electrochemical Society, and in 2011 he received the CRSI medal by the Chemical Research Society of India. In 2013 he was awarded the Langmuir Lectureship award.  In 2011 he was #59 on the list of the Top 100 Chemists, 2000-2010 by Thomson Reuters with an impact (citations per paper) of 64.91. He was listed among the world's most cited materials scientists by Elsevier Scopus in 2016. He is a Fellow of the Electrochemical Society, American Association for the Advancement of Science, and the American Chemical Society.

Recent publications
 Semiconductor Surface Chemistry as Holy Grail in Photocatalysis and Photovoltaics Accounts of Chemical Research, 2017, 50 (3), pp 527–531
 Revival of Solar Paint Concept: Air-Processable Solar Paints for the Fabrication of Quantum Dot-Sensitized Solar Cells The Journal of Physical Chemistry C 2017, 121 (33), pp 17658–17670
 AgInS2–ZnS Quantum Dots: Excited State Interactions with TiO2 and Photovoltaic Performance ACS Applied Materials & Interfaces, 2017, 9 (39), pp 33379–33388
 CsPbBr3 Solar Cells: Controlled Film Growth through Layer-by-Layer Quantum Dot Deposition Chemistry of Materials, 2017, ASAP
 Quantum Dot Light-Emitting Devices: Beyond Alignment of Energy Levels ACS Applied Materials & Interfaces 2017, 9 (36), pp 30741–30745
  Recent Advances in Quantum Dot Surface Chemistry ACS Applied Materials & Interfaces, 2014 ASAP.
  An Inorganic Hole Conductor for Organo-Lead Halide Perovskite Solar Cells. Improved Hole Conductivity with Copper Iodide  Journal of the American Chemical Society, 2014 136 (2) 758–764.
  Metal-Cluster-Sensitized Solar Cells. A New Class of Thiolated Gold Sensitizers Delivering Efficiency Greater Than 2%  Journal of the American Chemical Society, 2013 135 (24) 8822–8825.
  Making Graphene Holey. Gold-Nanoparticle-Mediated Hydroxyl Radical Attack on Reduced Graphene Oxide  ACS Nano, 2013 7 (6) 5546–5557.
  Quantum Dot Solar Cells. The Next Big Thing in Photovoltaics  Journal of Physical Chemistry Letters, 2013 4 (6) 908–918.
  Graphitic Design: Prospects of Graphene-Based Nanocomposites for Solar Energy Conversion, Storage, and Sensing  Accounts of Chemical Research, 2013 46 (10) 2235–2243.

External links
 Department of Chemistry and Biochemistry, University of Notre Dame
 Prashant V. Kamat profile (University of Notre Dame)
 Prashant V. Kamat Group Website (University of Notre Dame)

References

Boston University alumni
University of Texas at Austin alumni
University of Notre Dame faculty
Living people
21st-century American biochemists
Year of birth missing (living people)
Fellows of the American Association for the Advancement of Science
Fellows of the American Chemical Society